A juvenile court, also known as young offender's court or children's court, is a tribunal having special authority to pass judgements for crimes that are committed by children who have not attained the age of majority. In most modern legal systems, children who commit a crime are treated differently from legal adults that have committed the same offense.

Industrialized countries differ in whether juveniles should be charged  as adults for serious crimes or considered separately.  Since the 1970s, minors have been tried increasingly as adults in response to "increases in violent juvenile crime". Young offenders may still not be charged  as adults. Serious offenses, such as murder or rape, can be prosecuted through adult court in England. However, as of 2007, no United States data reported any exact numbers of juvenile offenders prosecuted as adults. In contrast, countries such as Australia and Japan are in the early stages of developing and implementing youth-focused justice initiatives Positive youth justice as a deferment from adult court.

Globally, the United Nations has encouraged nations to reform their systems to fit with a model in which "entire society [must] ensure the harmonious development of adolescence" despite the delinquent behavior that may be causing issues. The hope was to create a more "child-friendly justice". Despite all the changes made by the United Nations, the rules in practice are less clear cut. Changes in a broad context cause issues of implementation locally, and international crimes committed by youth are causing additional questions regarding the benefit of separate proceedings for juveniles.

Issues of juvenile justice have become increasingly global in several cultural contexts. As globalization has occurred in recent centuries, issues of justice, and more specifically protecting the rights of children as it relates to juvenile courts, have been called to question. Global policies regarding this issue have become more widely accepted, and a general culture of treatment of children offenders has adapted to this trend.

Models 
Juvenile court is a special court or department of a trial court, that deals with under-age defendants who are charged with crimes, are neglected, or are out of the control of their parents. The normal age of these defendants is under 18, but the age of majority changes based on the state or nation. Juvenile court does not have jurisdiction in cases in which minors are charged as adults. The procedure in juvenile court is not always adversarial, although the minor is entitled to legal representation by a lawyer. Parents, social workers, and probation officers may be involved in the process to achieve positive results and save the minor from involvement in future crimes. However, serious crimes and repeated offenses can result in sentencing juvenile offenders to prison, with transfer to a state prison upon reaching adulthood with limited maximum sentences, often until the age of 18, 21, 23 or 25. Where parental neglect or loss of control is a problem, the juvenile court may seek out foster homes for the juvenile, treating the child as a ward of the court. A juvenile court handles cases of both delinquency and dependency.  Delinquency refers to crimes committed by minors, and dependency includes cases where a non-parental person is chosen to care for a minor.

Restorative justice model 
When looking at juvenile justice as a whole two types of models tend to be used: restorative justice and criminal justice. Within the United States, there are systematic shifts towards a more restorative model of justice especially surrounding juveniles. Canada has long been practicing under a restorative model of justice and continues to grow and expand upon practices of integrating youth offenders into the community in hopes that they do not recidivate but become positive, contributing members of society. In addition to these countries, Austria has taken an initiative to implement victim-offender mediation programs geared towards a more restorative form of justice. New Zealand completely restructured their system with an emphasis on what the indigenous people, Māori, practiced for many years. This includes a family-centered focus that lowers youth incarceration. Globally, there is a trend of utilizing the traditional values of past generations to create a positive impact throughout juvenile court systems.

International human rights tribunals 

The prosecution of children in crimes against the state (in violation of international law) is a contested issue. This issue applies most significantly to children soldiers. One solution has been the integration of special juvenile courts for children being prosecuted for international crimes. In Sierra Leone, for example, people wanted the perpetrators to be held entirely responsible despite age or social context. When a juvenile is deferred to the special court, their treatment would be treated with more respect as well as a promotion of rehabilitation and reintegration, taking into account how young many of the child soldiers were. The Secretary General termed the use of the tribunals as a "moral dilemma". The children who become soldiers often do so as a result of a structural or systemic threat in their lives; however, they still are responsible for many violent and heinous acts. In this way they are both victims of regimes and guilty parties, causing the problem and dilemma that the United Nations has tried to address in Sierra Leone as well as other countries.

United States

Although the rules governing juvenile court vary significantly from state to state, the broad goal of U.S. juvenile courts is to provide a remedial or rehabilitative alternative to the adult criminal justice system. Although not always met, the ideal is to put a juvenile offender on the correct path to be a law-abiding adult.

Jurisdiction
Rules for jurisdiction of a juvenile court depend upon the state. In most states, juvenile court jurisdiction continues through the age of eighteen, but in some states it may end at age seventeen or younger. Some states, such as Arizona, have recently adopted extended jurisdiction policies, where jurisdiction remains under the authority of the presiding juvenile court system through the adjudicated delinquent juvenile's nineteenth year of age. At times, a juvenile offender who is initially charged in juvenile court will be waived to adult court, meaning that the offender may be tried and sentenced in the same manner as an adult.

Age of responsibility

There is no uniform national age from which a child is accountable in the juvenile court system; this varies between states.
 In 44 states, the maximum age for juvenile court jurisdiction is age seventeen.
 In five states (Georgia, Michigan, Missouri, Texas and Wisconsin) the maximum age for juvenile court jurisdiction is age sixteen.
 One state, North Carolina, has a maximum age for juvenile court jurisdiction of age fifteen.

States vary in relation to the age at which a child may be subject to juvenile court proceedings for delinquent behavior. Most states do not specify a minimum age as a matter of law. Of states that set a minimum age, for status offenses:
 Massachusetts and North Carolina set a minimum age of six.
 Connecticut and Mississippi set a minimum age of seven.
 Arizona sets a minimum age of eight.
And for delinquency:
 North Carolina sets a minimum age of six.
 Connecticut, New York, and Maryland set a minimum age of seven.
 Arkansas, Colorado, Kansas, Louisiana, Pennsylvania, South Dakota, Texas, Vermont and Wisconsin set a minimum age of ten.
 California sets a minimum age of 12 except for murder or rape, which for there is no minimum age.

Waiver to adult court

All states have laws that allow, and at times require, young offenders to be prosecuted or sentenced as adults for more serious offenses.

In Kent v. United States (1966), the United States Supreme Court held that a juvenile must be afforded due process rights, specifically that a waiver of jurisdiction from a juvenile court to a district court must be voluntary and knowing. The U.S. Supreme Court held, in the case of In re Gault (1967), that children accused in a juvenile delinquency proceeding have the rights to due process, counsel, and against self-incrimination, essentially the Miranda rights.  Writing for the majority, Associate Justice Abe Fortas wrote, "Under our Constitution, the condition of being a boy does not justify a kangaroo court." However, most juvenile proceedings are held without a jury as McKeiver v. Pennsylvania (1971) decided that minors do not have the same rights in this regard as adults.

Other cases
In some jurisdictions, in addition to delinquent cases, juvenile court hears cases involving child custody, child support, and visitation as well as cases where children are alleged to be abused or neglected.

Court procedure
Procedures in juvenile court, for juveniles charged with delinquent acts (acts that would be crimes if committed by adults) or status offenses (offenses that can only be committed by minors, such as running away from home, curfew violations and truancy) are typically less formal than proceedings in adult courts. Proceedings may be closed to the public, and a juvenile offender's name may be kept out of the public record.

Avoiding formal charges
In an American juvenile court, it is possible to avoid placing formal charges. Factors that may affect a court's treatment of a juvenile offender and the disposition of the case include:

 The severity of the offense. A serious crime is more likely to result in the filing of a petition than a less severe crime.
 The minor's age. Petitions are more likely to be filed in cases involving older children.
 The minor's past record. Formal charges are more likely when a minor has been previously involved with juvenile court.
 The strength of the evidence that the minor committed a crime. Obviously, stronger evidence leads to a greater likelihood of formal charges.
 The minor's sex. Formal charges are more likely to be filed against boys than against girls.
 The minor's social history. Petitions are more likely to be filed when children have a history of problems at home or school.
 The parent's or guardian's apparent ability to control the minor. The greater the lack of parental control, the more likely the intake officer is to file a petition.

Along with these seven, four "unofficial" factors can sway an official:

 The minor's attitude. Formal proceedings are less likely to occur when a child shows remorse for committing a crime.
 The minor's appearance. If the young person is polite, dressed well, and neatly groomed, then the intake personnel are more likely to handle the case informally.
 Whether the minor has family or community support. The more support the young person has, the more likely the intake officer is to deal with the case informally.
 Whether the minor has an attorney. Disposing of a case informally may be less likely when a child has a lawyer.

In Connecticut, a referral can be made to a non-court associated committee referred to as a Juvenile Review Board (JRB). These committees can present a resolution that does not result in a juvenile criminal record. However, there are qualifying circumstances for a case to be accepted for review, such as the type of offense (often must be minor in nature) and prior court involvement (many JRBs only accept first-time offenses).

Sentencing
Juvenile court sentences may range from:
 informal supervision, through which a court informally monitors a minor and dismisses a pending charge if the minor stays out of trouble;
 formal supervision, similar to adult probation, under which a juvenile meets with and is supervised by a juvenile probation officer; or
 incarceration, usually in a juvenile detention facility.

Mandatory minimum sentencing
Mandatory minimum sentences found their way into the juvenile justice system in the late 1970s out of concern that some juveniles were committing very serious criminal offenses. Mandatory minimum sentences might be imposed in juvenile court for some very serious crimes, such as homicide, and apply to juveniles in the same manner as adults if the juvenile is waived to adult court. The U.S. Supreme Court has ruled that the use of mandatory life sentences for juvenile offenders is unconstitutional.

Reform

In his 1997 book No Matter How Loud I Shout, a study of the Los Angeles' Juvenile Courts, Edward Humes argued that juvenile court systems are in need of radical reform. He stated that the system sends too many children with good chances of rehabilitation to adult court while pushing aside and acquitting children early on the road to crime instead of giving counseling, support, and accountability. 57% of children arrested for the first time are never arrested again, 27% are arrested one or two more times, and 16% commit four or more crimes.

In the United States specifically, there are arguments made against having a separate court for youths and juvenile delinquents. From this perspective, the construction of youth and being young is morphing and as such people believe the legal system should reflect these changes. Childhood currently, looks very different and is socially constructed in a much different pattern than in past historical context. Some argue that within our current social climate, a juvenile court system and having a separate deferment for people under the age of majority is no longer necessary as there are such blurred lines between the stages of childhood, youth, and young adulthood.

On a global scale, the United Nations has implemented reforms as it relating to juvenile courts and juvenile justice as a whole. Rules and regulations have been implemented to protect the children's rights, more specifically creating guidelines for punishment. Movements towards less punitive measures or agencies have been a trend in this regard. For example, in the United Nations general assembly, there was a proposal that "no child or young person should be subjected to harsh or degrading correction or punishment measures". Many Western countries have been condemned for not put these policies into practice nor differentiate the youths from adults in procedure or punishment. The United Nations believes that youths should have less harsh punishment and be deferred to more community supportive programs like tribunals or courts geared towards young people. In Western Europe, there are many countries also criticized and looked at by the United Nations for the disproportionate representation of racial and ethnic minorities in the juvenile court system of the racial and ethnic minority being over-represented.

The current regime allows for many systemic perpetuations of class divides, discrimination and gender inequalities. Another reform made by the United Nations is "informalism" in the mid-1900s where a push for diversion and less criminalizing happened. This was when many deferred programs and alternatives to formal criminal and adult jurisdictions changed, making it more child-friendly. In more recent years, the restorative justice model has been promoted as a better way to process and reintegrate youth who are involved in the court system back into the community. This model is multifaceted and requires a change in the cultural understanding of what it means to commit a crime as a person under the age of majority. The United Nations has offered aid to countries looking to move towards a restorative justice model as it is a positive change in from a human rights discourse. Difficulty in implementing restorative justice comes with cultural differences cross-nationally as well as the scope and breadth of the model. Additionally, the traditional values of adversarial justice have been rooted in the juvenile system for a very long time, which makes it difficult implement change on a global scale. Overall, the United Nation's attempts at changing the conversation and structure surrounding juvenile courts, have made small strides as many other issues continually being addressed.

There are also many arguments against the globalization of the reforms of juvenile court systems. Global juvenile justice lacks solutions to the flaws that come out of placing them in such a broad range of social contexts. For example, the case study of Moroccan youth as well as other ethnic minorities or migrant groups living in the Netherlands. There is a disconnect between the idea that crime is a local social problem, but there are movements to solve the problems more generically and on a much broader spectrum. In the Netherlands, the emphasis of juvenile court is rehabilitation despite the reality being a more punitive focused system when placed in practice. Juvenile courts cause further system bias and exclusion for these minority groups, and the disparity is a source of concern. One reason for this problem is the public discourse and police scrutiny—all of which stem from the failed cultural integration. Globalization of youth justice and the court then perpetuates this idea of an "international scapegoat" and causes issues that need more careful consideration for the putting global practices to work in local communities. As some scholars argue, globalization does not simplify the problem but rather complicates it as it challenges "traditional modes of analysis" and creates problems of identity.

See also

 Age of criminal responsibility
 Borstal
Children's Court Clinic, New South Wales, Australia
Children's Court of New South Wales, Australia
Children's Court of Queensland, Australia
Children's Court of Victoria, Australia
Children's Court of Western Australia
 Gender responsive approach for girls in the juvenile justice system
 Ghanaian juvenile justice system
 Girl's court
 The Juvenile Court in Hong Kong
 Minor (law)
Teen court, aka youth court or peer court
Youth Court of New Zealand
Youth Koori Court (Australia)
 Youth justice (disambiguation)

References

External links

Information about Juvenile Justice from the Penal Reform International website.
The Gault Center, formerly the National Juvenile Defender Center
Juveniles involved in the Justice System a review of the juvenile justice system in the United States, comparing it to Canada.
 Prevent Delinquency Project

Court
Court
Court
Courts by type